Mahelma is a suburb of the city of Algiers in northern Algeria.

Notable people

Communes of Algiers Province
Cities in Algeria
Algeria